The name Samwise may refer to
Samwise Gamgee, a fictional character in J. R. R. Tolkien's fantasy world Middle-earth
Samwise Didier, an artist and Art Director at Blizzard Entertainment
 Samwise, a web-comic from Scott Kurtz

de:Figuren in Tolkiens Welt#Samweis Gamdschie (Sam)